Pseudoalteromonas marina is a marine bacterium isolated from tidal sediment near Chungnam.

References

External links
 
Type strain of Pseudoalteromonas marina at BacDive -  the Bacterial Diversity Metadatabase

Alteromonadales
Bacteria described in 2007